Aleksandr Vitalyevich Shumov (born 8 March 1991) is a Russian former professional football player.

Club career
He made his Russian Premier League debut on 17 July 2010 for FC Sibir Novosibirsk in a game against FC Zenit Saint Petersburg.

External links

References

1991 births
Living people
Russian footballers
Association football midfielders
FC Sibir Novosibirsk players
Russian Premier League players